Neville Coleman OAM (1938 - 4 May 2012) was an Australian naturalist, underwater nature photographer, writer, publisher and educator.

Coleman started scuba diving in 1963, exploring Sydney Harbour. Later he joined a scientific study group and, in 1969, commenced a project aiming to document the entire marine life of Australia, using underwater photography.

His first book, Australian marine fishes in colour, was published in 1974 and he subsequently authored more than 50 books. His books included various texts for scuba divers, shell collectors, amateur naturalists and children, and typically took the forms of field guides, encyclopedias and dive guides. Departures included a collaboration with a poet and CD-ROM companions to printed publications, which included video clips of marine species. His photographs often appeared in publications by other authors on marine subjects.

In 2007 Coleman was inducted to the International Scuba Diving Hall of Fame and, in 2011, he was awarded the Medal of the Order of Australia (OAM) for "service to conservation and the environment through the photographic documentation of Australian marine species". Coleman died of natural causes at 4:55am on 4 May 2012, in his sleep.

Taxon named in his honor 
Coleman discovered many marine creatures new to science. Several species of fish, nudibranchs and other invertebrates have been named after him, including:
The mantis shrimp Lysiosquilla colemani
The nudibranch Chromodoris colemani
The pygmy seahorse Hippocampus colemani
The Sand perch Parapercis colemani

Legacy 
Neville Coleman Memorial Dives are held annually, with special events including a sea slug photo competition and public art exhibition held in South Australia.

Bibliography

References

External links
Neville Coleman's website - no longer exists
Books by Neville Coleman
 National Library of Australia
Scuba Hall of Fame
CSIRO Taxon Report
Australian Museum

1938 births
2012 deaths
Australian naturalists
Australian non-fiction writers
Australian photographers
Australian underwater divers
Underwater photographers
Recipients of the Medal of the Order of Australia